Chay Varsham (also Romanized as Chāy Varshām; also known as Chāh Varshān, Chāy Varshān, Shāh Varshān, and Varshān) is a village in Gheyzaniyeh Rural District, in the Central District of Ahvaz County, Khuzestan Province, Iran. At the 2006 census, its population was 60, in 13 families.

References 

Populated places in Ahvaz County